Gerald Giam Yean Song (born 1977) is a Singaporean politician. A member of the opposition Workers' Party (WP), he has been the Member of Parliament (MP) representing the Bedok Reservoir–Punggol division of Aljunied GRC since 2020.

Education
Giam Was educated at Anglo-Chinese School (Independent) and Anglo-Chinese Junior College. He holds a Bachelor of Science in electrical engineering from the University of Southern California and a Master of Science in international political economy from Nanyang Technological University.

Career
Giam has worked in various roles in the information technology industry, including as a senior consultant at Avanade and a project manager at MSC Consulting. He was also a foreign service officer at the Ministry of Foreign Affairs and had volunteered as a youth leader in the South West Community Development Council. He was also previously a deputy editor at The Online Citizen.

Giam is the chief technology officer of an information technology solutions company which he co-founded. He is a Registered Management Consultant certified by the Institute of Management Consultants (Singapore).

Political career

Following the 2011 general election, Giam first entered politics in a five-member Workers' Party team contesting in the East Coast GRC against the People's Action Party (PAP). The Workers' Party team lost with 45.2% of the votes. 

As the best performing defeated team, Giam was offered a Non-constituency Member of Parliament (NCMP) seat in Parliament.  On 13 May 2011, the Workers' Party confirmed that Giam would take up the NCMP seat. 

With Giam taking up the NCMP position together with Yee Jenn Jong, the Workers' Party set a new record in Singapore's electoral history by becoming the first opposition party to have eight (six elected and two NCMP) seats in Parliament.

Giam served as a NCMP in the 12th Parliament from 10 October 2011 to 25 August 2015. 

Following the 2015 general election, Giam contested in  a four-member Workers' Party team contesting in the East Coast GRC and went against the People's Action Party (PAP). The Workers' Party team lost with 39.27% of the votes.  

As the opposition team with third highest percentage of votes among unelected candidates, anyone on Giam's team would be nominated to take up the third NCMP position. Instead of taking up the position for himself as the leader of the team, he proposed within the party that his teammate, Leon Perera to take up to position.

During the 2020 general election, Giam joined a five-member Workers' Party team contesting in Aljunied GRC and they won with 59.95% of the vote against the People's Action Party team. Giam thus became the Member of Parliament representing the Bedok Reservoir–Punggol ward of Aljunied GRC in the 14th Parliament.

Giam was elected as Policy Research Team Head of the Workers' Party Central Executive Committee in 2022.

Personal life
Giam is married with two children. Giam is a Christian.

References

External links
 Gerald Giam on Parliament of Singapore
 Gerald Giam - General Election 2020 Candidate at Workers' Party
 

USC Viterbi School of Engineering alumni
Living people
1977 births
Singaporean people of Hokkien descent
Workers' Party (Singapore) politicians
Anglo-Chinese School alumni
Singaporean Non-constituency Members of Parliament
Members of the Parliament of Singapore